The Medical Women's International Association is a non-governmental organization founded in 1919 with the purpose of representing female physicians worldwide. Esther Lovejoy was its first president. The Association grew from an international meeting of medical women attending a YWCA meeting in America and a group of medical women in Britain, notably Dr Jane Walker. Dr. Ida Kahn was one of the Chinese representatives at the International Conference of Medical Women (1919).

In 1954, the International Association of Medical Women promoted the realization of the first Congress of Medical Women, its president Ada Chree Reid visited Madrid and Barcelona, in this city she was received by the gynecologist  Marina Soliva Corominas and a group of Catalan female doctors.

References

External links 
 Medical Women's International Association website

International medical and health organizations
Organizations established in 1919
Organizations for women in science and technology
International medical associations